Chionodes dryobathra is a moth in the family Gelechiidae. It is found in Colombia.

The wingspan is 13–14 mm. The forewings are dark fuscous with a brown basal patch occupying about one-fourth of the wing, the edge irregularly curved or bent. The stigmata are blackish, approximated, with the plical somewhat obliquely before the first discal. There is a small pale brownish spot on the costa at three-fourths. The hindwings are grey.

References

Chionodes
Moths described in 1917
Moths of South America